Club Esportiu Mercadal is a football team based in Es Mercadal, Balearic Islands. Founded in 1923, the team plays in 3ª - Group 11.

The club's home ground is Estadio San Martì.

Season to season

11 seasons in Tercera División

References

External links
Futbolme team profile 
CE Mercadal on FFIB.es 

Football clubs in the Balearic Islands
Sport in Menorca
Association football clubs established in 1923
1923 establishments in Spain